Specula retifera is a species of minute sea snail, a marine gastropod mollusc in the family Cerithiopsidae.

Distribution
This marine species occurs off New Zealand.

References

 Spencer, H.G., Marshall, B.A. & Willan, R.C. (2009). Checklist of New Zealand living Mollusca. Pp 196-219. in: Gordon, D.P. (ed.) New Zealand inventory of biodiversity. Volume one. Kingdom Animalia: Radiata, Lophotrochozoa, Deuterostomia. Canterbury University Press, Christchurch
 Maxwell, P.A. (2009). Cenozoic Mollusca. Pp 232-254 in Gordon, D.P. (ed.) New Zealand inventory of biodiversity. Volume one. Kingdom Animalia: Radiata, Lophotrochozoa, Deuterostomia. Canterbury University Press, Christchurch.

Further reading
 Powell A. W. B., New Zealand Mollusca, William Collins Publishers Ltd, Auckland, New Zealand 1979

External links
  Suter H. (1908). Additions to the marine molluscan fauna of New Zealand, with descriptions of new species. Proceedings of the Malacological Society of London. 8: 22-42, pls 2-3
 Marshall B. (1978). Cerithiopsidae of New Zealand, and a provisional classification of the family. New Zealand Journal of Zoology 5(1): 47-120

Cerithiopsidae
Gastropods of New Zealand
Gastropods described in 1908